is a retired male badminton player of Japan.

Career
He won seven Japanese national men's singles titles from the mid-1970s to the mid-1980s. He played at the Inter-Zone Ties of 1979 Thomas Cup  and 1982 Thomas Cup.

He is a senior official of the Japan national badminton team and Sanyo now.

References

Living people
1953 births
Sportspeople from Ishikawa Prefecture
Japanese male badminton players
Badminton players at the 1978 Asian Games
Asian Games competitors for Japan
20th-century Japanese people